Abdoulaye Karim Doudou (born 25 September 1998) is a Nigerien footballer who currently plays as a defender for Nigerian side Dakkada.

Career statistics

International

References

External links
 

1998 births
Living people
Nigerien footballers
Niger youth international footballers
Niger international footballers
Association football defenders
Leixões S.C. players
Nigerien expatriate footballers
Expatriate footballers in Ghana
Nigerien expatriate sportspeople in Ghana
Expatriate footballers in Portugal
Nigerien expatriate sportspeople in Portugal
Expatriate footballers in Nigeria
Nigerien expatriate sportspeople in Nigeria